David Eugene Joyner (born July 4, 1963) is  an American actor. He is best known for physically portraying Barney (with Bob West and then Duncan Brannan and Tim Dever voicing the character) from 1991 to 2001, and 2022 to present on the 2-part adult docuseries I Love You, You Hate Me, the successor children's television series Barney & Friends and its predecessor Barney and the Backyard Gang (in the last two videos). Later on, he played the title character of Hip Hop Harry.

Early life
Joyner was born July 4, 1963, in Decatur, Illinois, to Roscoe and Mary Joyner. He attended MacArthur High School and graduated with a Bachelor of Science degree in Electronic engineering technology from the ITT Technical Institute in Indianapolis, Indiana. He worked as a software analyst for Texas Instruments for six years.

Career
Joyner once stated that he had a dream the night before he auditioned to play the role of Barney. In the dream, Barney passed out and Joyner had to give him mouth to mouth resuscitation. And on the day of the audition, Joyner stopped at a red light and noticed a billboard above him for Southwest Airlines. It said "breathe life into your vacation." Joyner decided that "if I could breathe life into this character, I was going on vacation."

Joyner originally auditioned for the role in 1991, replacing Barney's original costume actor, David Voss. Joyner was originally cast as the back-up performer, but took over the role after the actress originally chosen had difficulty staying in the costume for long periods of time.

Joyner was originally cast to play Barney in two Barney & The Backyard Gang home videos, but continued to play Barney in the TV series Barney & Friends during the first six seasons, as well as in live performances. After the fourth season episode "Let's Eat", he left to film Barney's Great Adventure and was replaced with Josh Martin and Maurice Scott for the rest of the season. Joyner returned to perform Barney in Barney in Outer Space in 1997. After he left the series, he also continued to play him for occasional appearances until 2005 with a brief return in 2008.

At that time, he was replaced with Carey Stinson who also performed the character during birthday parties in 1991 and then for public appearances starting in 1992. He also started to perform him in stage shows such as Barney Live in New York City in 1994 as a peanut salesman and for his balcony scenes, Barney's Big Surprise, and Barney's Musical Castle Live!. Then he portrayed him full time in the TV series starting with the seventh season until 2022.

Outside of acting, Joyner also works as a tantric massage therapist.

Filmography

Film

Television

Web

Theater

References

External links
 
  - Interview of David Joyner

People from Decatur, Illinois
Living people
African-American male actors
American male television actors
1963 births
20th-century American male actors
21st-century American male actors
20th-century African-American people
21st-century African-American people